Mr. House Husband is a South Korean television entertainment program, where six men who do housekeeping and parenting are observed by their fellow cast members. For season 2, the format changed and the cast members' recordings were observed and narrated by two hosts.

Broadcasting period

Season 1

Cast

Special cast

Guest appearances

Season 2

Cast

Former cast

Special cast

Guest appearances

Note: This list is incomplete.

Ratings

2016

2017 (season 1)

2017 (season 2)

On 14 June 2017 there was a special broadcast of episodes 1–4 of Queen for Seven Days instead of an episode of Mr. House Husband.
On 20 September 2017 a special episode was broadcast.

2018

Special episodes were broadcast between 1 November 2017 and 27 January 2018 due to KBS' strike.
From 14 February 2018 to 21 February 2018, the 2018 Pyeong-chang Winter Olympics were being broadcast.
On 16 February 2018, the episode airtime changed to 6:15 pm due to the live broadcast of the 2018 Pyeong-chang Winter Olympics.
On 20 June 2018, the group stage game (Portugal vs. Morocco) of the 2018 Russia World Cup was broadcast in place of an episode of Mr. House Husband.
On 15 August 2018, the women's basketball qualifiers game (Korea vs. Indonesia) of the 2018 Jakarta and Palembang Asian Games was broadcast in place of an episode of Mr. House Husband.
On 25 September 2018, a two-part Chuseok special of Mr. House Husband (Season 2) was broadcast.
On 31 October and 7 November 2018, the 2018 KBO League games were broadcast instead of Mr. House Husband episodes.

2019

Awards and nominations

References

External links
 

Korean-language television shows
Korean Broadcasting System original programming
South Korean reality television series
2016 South Korean television series debuts